The 2001 Vuelta a España was the 56th edition of the Vuelta a España, one of cycling's Grand Tours. The Vuelta began in Salamanca, with an individual time trial on 8 September, and Stage 11 occurred on 19 September with a stage to Estació de Pal. The race finished in Madrid on 30 September.

Stage 1
8 September 2001 — Salamanca to Salamanca,  (ITT)

Stage 2
9 September 2001 — Salamanca to Valladolid,

Stage 3
10 September 2001 — Valladolid to León,

Stage 4
11 September 2001 — León to Gijón,

Stage 5
12 September 2001 — Gijón to Lagos de Covadonga,

Stage 6
13 September 2001 — Cangas de Onís to Torrelavega,

Stage 7
14 September 2001 — Torrelavega to Torrelavega,  (ITT)

Stage 8
15 September 2001 — Reinosa to Alto de la Cruz de la Demanda (Valdezcaray),

Stage 9
16 September 2001 — Logroño to Zaragoza,

Rest day 1
17 September 2001 — Province of Barcelona

Stage 10
18 September 2001 — Sabadell to Supermolina,

Stage 11
19 September 2001 — Alp to Estació de Pal,

References

2001 Vuelta a España
Vuelta a España stages